Leila Hyams (May 1, 1905 – December 4, 1977) was an American film and stage actress, model, and vaudevillian, who came from a show business family. Her relatively short film career began in 1924 during the era of silent films and ended in 1936 (excepting a 1946 short film appearance). The blonde blue-eyed ingenue and leading lady appeared in more than 50 film roles and remained a press favourite, with numerous magazine covers.

Early life
She was born in New York City to vaudeville comedy performers John Hyams and Leila (née McIntyre) Hyams. Her mother was a noted stage performer, and both her parents appeared in films. They can be seen together in several Hollywood films including The Housekeeper's Daughter (1939).

Stage performer 
Hyams appeared on stage with her parents while still a child, working in their vaudeville act for five years.

Modelling
As a teenager, she worked as a model and became well known across the United States after appearing in a successful series of newspaper advertisements. This success led her to Hollywood.

Film career

She made her first film in 1924, and with her blonde hair, green eyes, delicate features, and good-natured demeanor, was cast in a string of supporting roles, where she was required to do very little but smile and look pretty. She proved herself capable of handling the small roles she was assigned, and over a period of time she came to be taken seriously as an actress. By 1928, she was playing starring roles, achieving success in MGM's first talkie release, Alias Jimmy Valentine (1928) opposite William Haines, Lionel Barrymore, and Karl Dane.  The following year, she appeared in the popular murder mystery The Thirteenth Chair, a role that offered her the chance to display her dramatic abilities as a murder suspect. At Fox that same year, she appeared in director Allan Dwan's  now lost romantic adventure The Far Call opposite Charles Morton. The quality of her parts continued to improve as the decade turned, including a role as Robert Montgomery's sister in the prison drama The Big House (1930) with Chester Morris and Wallace Beery, for which Hyams once again received positive reviews. She then appeared in Surrender (1931) in which Warner Baxter and Ralph Bellamy desperately competed for her attention. 

Although she succeeded in films that required her to play pretty ingenues, and developed into a capable dramatic actress in 1930s crime melodramas, she is perhaps best remembered for two early 1930s horror movies, as the wise-cracking but kind-hearted circus performer Venus in Freaks (1932) and as the heroine in the Charles Laughton/Bela Lugosi film Island of Lost Souls (1932). Hyams was the original choice to play Jane in Tarzan the Ape Man (1932), but turned it down. The role was played by Maureen O'Sullivan. She also appeared in the then-controversial Jean Harlow film Red-Headed Woman (1932) and the musical comedy The Big Broadcast (1932) with Bing Crosby, George Burns, and Gracie Allen, and was praised for her comedic performance in Ruggles of Red Gap (1935). She made 1,000 Dollars a Minute for Republic in 1935 and retired soon after.

Personal life

 

Hyams married her talent agent Phil Berg in 1927. In 1936, after a 12-year acting career and performing in 50 films, she retired from the motion-picture industry; nevertheless, she remained active in the Hollywood community for the rest of her life. In 1977, after a brief illness, Hyams died at age 72 at her home in Bel-Air in Los Angeles. She was survived by her husband, Phil.

Complete filmography

Sandra (1924) - Mait Stanley
Dancing Mothers (1926) - Birdie Courtney
The Kick-Off (1926) - Marilyn Spencer
Summer Bachelors (1926) - Willowdean French
The Brute (1927) - Jennifer Duan
White Pants Willie (1927) - Helen Charters
The Bush Leaguer (1927) - Alice Hobbs
One-Round Hogan (1927) - Helen Davis
The Wizard (1927) - Anne Webster
The Branded Sombrero (1928) - Connie Marsh
A Girl in Every Port (1928) - Widow in San Pedro, Belize
The Crimson City (1928) - Nadine Howells
Honor Bound (1928) - Selma Ritchie
Land of the Silver Fox (1928) - Marie du Fronque
Alias Jimmy Valentine (1928) - Rose
Spite Marriage (1929) - Ethyl Norcrosse
The Far Call (1929) - Hilda Larsen
The Idle Rich (1929) - Joan Thayer aka Joan Van Luyn
Wonder of Women (1929) - Karen
Masquerade (1929) - Sylvia Graeme
Hurricane (1929) - Mary Stevens
The Thirteenth Chair (1929) - Helen O'Neill
The Bishop Murder Case (1930) - Belle Dillard
The Girl Said No (1930) - Mary Howe
The Flirting Widow (1930) - Evelyn
The Big House (1930) - Anne Marlowe
Sweethearts and Wives (1930) - Angela Worthington
The Sins of the Children (1930) - Alma Wagenkampf
Way Out West (1930) - Molly Rankin
Way for a Sailor (1930) - Joan
Part Time Wife (1930) - Mrs. Murdock
Gentleman's Fate (1931) - Marjorie Channing
Men Call It Love (1931) - Connie
Stepping Out (1931) - Eve Martin
The Phantom of Paris (1931) - Cecile Bourrelier
New Adventures of Get Rich Quick Wallingford (1931) - Dorothy
Surrender (1931) - Axelle von Meirbach
The Christmas Party (1931, Short) - Herself (uncredited)
Freaks (1932) - Venus
Red-Headed Woman (1932) - Irene Legendre
The Big Broadcast (1932) - Anita Rogers
Island of Lost Souls (1932) - Ruth Thomas
The Constant Woman (1933) - Lou
Horse Play (1933) - Angelica Wayne
Sing Sinner Sing (1933) - Lela Larson
Saturday's Millions (1933) - Joan Chandler
The Poor Rich (1934) - Grace Hunter
Affairs of a Gentleman (1934) - Gladys Durland
No Ransom (1934) - Barbara Winfield
Ruggles of Red Gap (1935) - Nell Kenner
People Will Talk (1935) - Peggy Trask
1,000 Dollars a Minute (1935) - Dorothy Summers
Yellow Dust (1936) - Nellie Bryan
First Aid (1943, short) - Red Cross Worker

References

External links

Leila Hyams at Virtual History

1905 births
1977 deaths
American film actresses
American silent film actresses
Actresses from New York City
People from Greater Los Angeles
Vaudeville performers
20th-century American actresses